A tactical data link (TDL) uses a data link standard in order to provide communication via radio waves or cable used by NATO nations. All military C3 systems use standardized TDL to transmit, relay and receive tactical data. 

Multi-TDL network (MTN) refers to the network of similar and dissimilar TDLs integrated through gateways, translators, and correlators to bring the common tactical picture and/or common operational picture together.

Change of terminology 

The term tactical digital information link (TADIL) was made obsolete (per DISA guidance) and is now more commonly seen as tactical data link (TDL).

Tactical data link character 

TDLs are characterized by their standard message and transmission formats.  This is usually written as <Message Format>/<Transmission Format>.

TDL standards in NATO 
In NATO, tactical data link standards are being developed by the Data Link Working Group (DLWG) of the Information Systems Sub-Committee (ISSC) in line with the appropriate STANAG.

Synopsis of TDL links 
In NATO, there exist tactical data link standards as follows:

See also 
 BACN
 Global Information Grid
 Inter/Intra Flight Data Link (IFDL)
 JREAP
 MANDRIL
 Multifunction Advanced Data Link
 Network emulation for simulation / emulation of tactical data links
 SIMPLE
 Tactical Common Data Link

External links 
 Federation of American Scientists TDL information page
 This article was originally based on public domain text from Army Airspace Command and Control in a Combat Zone, Headquarters, Department of the Army, publication FM 3-52 (FM 100-103), August 2002

Military communications
NATO standardisation